4769 Castalia is a near-Earth object and potentially hazardous asteroid of the Apollo group, approximately  in diameter and was the first asteroid to be modeled by radar imaging. It was discovered on 9 August 1989, by American astronomer Eleanor Helin (Caltech) on photographic plates taken at Palomar Observatory in California. It is named after Castalia, a nymph in Greek mythology. It is also a Mars- and Venus-crosser asteroid.

General information

On 25 August 1989 Castalia passed  (within eleven lunar distances) of Earth, allowing it to be observed with radar from the Arecibo Observatory by Scott Hudson (Washington State University) and Steven J. Ostro (JPL). The data allowed Hudson et al. to produce a three-dimensional model of the object. During the 1989 passage Castalia peaked at an apparent magnitude of 12.

Castalia has a peanut shape, suggesting two approximately 800-meter-diameter pieces held together by their weak mutual gravity. Since then radar observations of other asteroids have found other contact binaries.

Castalia is a potentially hazardous asteroid (PHA) because its minimum orbit intersection distance (MOID) is less than 0.05 AU and its diameter is greater than 150 meters. Its orbit is well-determined for the next several hundred years.

See also
 List of notable asteroids

References

External links
 
 NASA Asteroid Radar Search – The 228 Radar-Detected Asteroids: Asteroid 4769 Castalia
 
 
 

004769
Discoveries by Eleanor F. Helin
Named minor planets
004769
004769
004769
19890809
20230822